Alex Aparecido Felipe dos Santos (born 23 April 1993), commonly known as Alex, is a Brazilian futsal player who plays for Norilsk Nickel and the Brazilian national futsal team as a winger.

Honours
UEFA Futsal Champions League: 2018–19

External links
Liga Nacional de Futsal profile

1993 births
Living people
Sportspeople from São Paulo
Brazilian men's futsal players
Sporting CP futsal players